Open Space is a programme produced by the BBC's Community Programme Unit. It was an evolution of the earlier Open Door series of programmes allowing minority points of view to make a television programme about issues of concern to them. The programmes were transmitted on BBC2 in a mid-evening slot, usually 8 pm, and would attract audiences between 500,000 and 1,500,000.

In a typical year there would be two or three groups of up to eight Open Space programmes each usually half an hour long.  A producer, an assistant, and in 1990 a budget of up to £25,000, would be allocated to each programme.

References

 Vox Pops – The BBC’s Community Programme Unit –  Fred Johnson

External links
 Open Space variation of the BBC 2 Ident

BBC Television shows
Social anthropology
1983 British television series debuts
1995 British television series endings
1980s British television series
1990s British television series